Tuanku Munawir ibni Almarhum Tuanku Abdul Rahman (22 March 1922 – 14 April 1967) was the ninth Yang Di-Pertuan Besar (Grand Ruler) of the Malaysian State of Negeri Sembilan. He was the eldest son of the first of Yang Di-Pertuan Agong of Malaysia, Tuanku Abdul Rahman with his second consort Tunku Maharun.

He ascended the throne as the Grand Ruler of Negeri Sembilan when his father died on 1 April 1960. His younger brother, Tuanku Ja'afar succeeded him after his death due to the relatively young age of his son. His son later became the eleventh Yamtuan Besar.

Honours

Honours of Malaya
  : 
 Grand Commander of Order of the Defender of the Realm (SMN) - Tun (1958)
 Recipient of the Order of the Crown of the Realm (DMN) (1961)
:
 First Class in gold of the Sultan Ismail of Johor Coronation Medal (10 February 1960)

Foreign Honours
:
 Member of the Royal Family Order of the Crown of Brunei (DKMB) (24 September 1958)

:
 Recipient of the Queen Elizabeth II Coronation Medal (2 June 1953)

References

Munawir
1922 births
1967 deaths
Munawir
Munawir
Malaysian Muslims
People educated at Aldenham School
Malaysian people of Minangkabau descent

Grand Commanders of the Order of the Defender of the Realm
First Classes of the Royal Family Order of Johor
Members of the Royal Family Order of Kedah
First Classes of the Family Order of Terengganu
20th-century Malaysian politicians
Recipients of the Order of the Crown of the Realm